Lodno is a village and municipality in Kysucké Nové Mesto District in the Zilina Region of northern Slovakia.

History
In historical records the village was first mentioned in 1658.

Geography
The municipality lies at an altitude of 513 metres and covers an area of 8.847 km². It has a population of about 991 people.

References

External links
 
 
https://web.archive.org/web/20070427022352/http://www.statistics.sk/mosmis/eng/run.html Dead link

Villages and municipalities in Kysucké Nové Mesto District